Judah Lewis (born ) is an American actor. He is known for his main roles in the films The Babysitter, its sequel The Babysitter: Killer Queen, and Demolition.

Life and career 
Lewis is the son of Hara and Mark Lewis, who are acting teachers. He is Jewish.

In 2014, Lewis played in the Lifetime television film Deliverance Creek.

In May 2015, Lewis was among the six actors who screen tested for the lead role (which went to Tom Holland) in the 2017 reboot film Spider-Man: Homecoming.

In 2015, Lewis played a supporting role in the comedy-drama film Demolition. He also played in the action thriller remake Point Break, appearing briefly as the young version of the lead character Johnny Utah.

In 2015, Lewis filmed the role of a boy hunted by his babysitter in the comedy horror film The Babysitter. The finished film was acquired by Netflix in December 2016 and was released on October 13, 2017.

In 2018, Lewis co-starred in the Canadian horror mystery film Summer of 84. Lewis played a supporting role in the Netflix family film The Christmas Chronicles. In 2019, he co-starred in the thriller film I See You.

In 2020, he reprised his main role in the comedy horror sequel film The Babysitter: Killer Queen on Netflix. He also reprised his role as Teddy in the sequel film The Christmas Chronicles 2.

Filmography

Film

Television

References

External links 
 
 

2000s births
Living people
American male film actors
American male television actors
Place of birth missing (living people)
American male child actors
Jewish American male actors
21st-century American male actors